Donald McKenna may refer to:

 Donald McKenna (cricketer) (1944–1995), Australian cricketer
 Donald McKenna (philanthropist) (1907–1997), American philanthropist